The 1937 Auckland Rugby League season was its 29th. Richmond Rovers won their third Fox Memorial title with a 10 win, 1 draw, 3 loss record. At one point they threatened to run away with the title when after 9 rounds they had a 4-point lead over their nearest challengers. However a loss to Ponsonby United in round 10, a draw with Manukau in round 12, and a loss to Marist Old Boys in round 13 meant that the title was not decided until the final round. They however beat the wooden spooners Newton Rangers 30–9 to secure the title.

After a disappointing 1936 season Marist Old Boys finished 3rd in the Fox Memorial, one point behind Richmond and then went on to win the Roope Rooster knockout competition with wins over Newton Rangers, City Rovers, and Ponsonby United 25–10 in the final. They then defeated Richmond Rovers in the Stormont Shield champion of champions match 12–5. They were helped significantly by the record breaking point scoring of John Anderson. He scored 154 points through all matches for Marist during the season which was comfortably the most in Auckland Rugby League club history with only Bill Davidson (116) in 1922, and Frank Delgrosso (108) in 1929 even passing the 100 point mark.

North Shore Albions won the Phelan Shield after being knocked out of the Roope Rooster competition in the first round. They beat Richmond, Manukau and then Mount Albert in the final 22–18. Richmond won the reserve grade title (Norton Cup). Marist won the reserve grade knockout competition (Stallard Cup) by defeating Ponsonby 22–5 in the final.

The 9 team Senior B grade was won once again by Papakura who finished with a 14 win, 1 loss record to lead the trailing Point Chevalier who finished with 11 wins and 3 losses. Papakura also won the knockout competition when they defeated Green Lane 19–7 in the final.

The representative season saw Auckland beat Auckland Māori 24–14, followed by wins on the same day over South Auckland (Waikato) 26–12, and Taranaki (27-10), though 2 separate teams were obviously used. At the end of the season an injury depleted Auckland side lost to a very strong New Zealand Māori team 43–21. The New Zealand Māori side had earlier defeated the touring Australian side and included George Nēpia. The Auckland Māori side played two matches, aside from their game against Auckland, against Waikato Māori and North Auckland Māori. They won the matches 28-6 and 37-3 respectively.

Auckland Rugby League meetings and news

Annual general meeting
The 27th annual meeting was held on April 5 with John A. Lee speaking at length as president about the importance of sport for the health of men and women. He went on to say “you know I consider that all the defeats, or rather, disabilities, this code has had, and had overcome, have welded it strongly… we like the other game, and good fellows we know are playing it, but we think and know our game is better. In other words, we like the other game, Rugby Union, but we like our own game best. It may be an offshoot. I suppose it is a case of the juvenile being better than the parent (Applause). Anyhow, we think our game is improved, livened up, harder and faster, and it has a tempo more in keeping with our time…” The meeting made reference to the passing of John Stormont, A. Cowan, Dr. Tracy Inglis from the previous year. The balance sheet showed gate receipts for club matches were £3584 5/ which was an increase of £769 15/9 as compared to 1934, and £285 12/ compared with 1935. Grants made to clubs from gate percentages totalled £658 18/1, which was an increase of 20 percent over 1935. The following officers were elected:-patron, Mr. J. B. Donald; vice patron, Mr. J.F.W. Dickson; president, hon. John A. Lee; vice presidents, Messrs. E. Davis, R.D. Bagnall, R. Benson, J. Bellamy, O. Blackwood, J. Donald, C. Drysdale, H. Grange, R.J. Laird, W.J. Lovett, E. Morton, E. Montgomery, T.G. Symonds, Joe Sayegh, C. Seagar, F.W. Schramm, M.P., W. Wallace, H. Walmsley, R.H. Wood, G.T. Wright and H.W. Brien; trustees, Messrs. J.W. Probert and Jim Rukutai (re-elected), and T. Davis and F.T. McAneny as new members; junior delegate, Mr. D. Wilkie; referees delegate, Mr. W. Mincham. A Stormont was succeeding his father as a trustee.

The Board of Control met in early April with the chairman Mr. G. Grey Campbell welcoming new members Messrs. Davis and McAneny. Ivan Culpan and J.E. Knowling were re-elected honorary secretary and honorary treasurer respectively. Mr. R. Doble was re-elected delegate on the New Zealand Rugby League Council and Press steward; auditor, Mr. R.A. Spinley; honorary solicitor, Mr. H.M. Rogerson; honorary physicians, Drs. M.G. Pezaro, F.J. Gwynne, K.H. Holdgate, J.H. Waddell, G.W. Lock, H. Burrell, and S. Morris; honorary masseur, Mr. F. Flanagan: time keepers, Messrs. T. Hill, and A.E. Chapman. The following were appointed to committees:- Insurance, Messrs. Doble, Davis, and Wilkie; Accounts, Messrs. Knowling, J.W. Probert and F.T. McAneny; Emergency, chairman and any three members of the board. It was decided that the season would begin on April 17 when a preliminary round of two Saturdays will be started and a night match may be arranged with the championship officially opening on May 1. Senior team nominations would be dealt with on April 14.

Coronation dance
On May 11 the Auckland Rugby League held a Coronation dance at the Peter Pan venue. Over 800 people attended with music being supplied by Theo Walter's Band.

Auckland representative team
At the control board meeting on April 14 it was decided to appoint Hec Brisbane as the sole Auckland selector for the season. Brisbane was a former New Zealand international (50 matches including 10 tests), Auckland representative (14 matches from 1923 to 1933), and who had played for and captained Marist Old Boys from 1923 to 1934 in 156 matches.

Australian visit and St George request
In August the Australian side played two tests against New Zealand and another midweek match against New Zealand Māori. All three matches were played at Carlaw Park. New Zealand lost the first test 12–8, before winning the second test 16-15 while New Zealand Māori defeated Australia 16–5. Following the matches Ernie Asher, on behalf of the Māori Control Board presented the ARL committee with a framed photograph of the team. Chairman Mr. G. Grey Campbell “pointed out that the victory was a historic event in league history”. St. George cabled the ARL on September 2 requesting the opportunity to tour for three matches at some point on or after September 18 however the ARL regrettedly declined as it had been a long season and the national side had already played matches in Auckland. They had also offered to have Frank Burge the former international forward coach the Auckland team for two weeks whilst here.

First grade competition
The same teams as 1936 all nominated sides to compete in the Fox Memorial championship once again. The ARL decided to play 2 preliminary rounds in mid and late April before commencing the season proper on May 1. Prior to the opening round of preliminary games the Auckland Star wrote: Manukau, with a pack averaging over 14st per man, will include “Logan, the Central Hawke's Bay representative five eighths. Their challenge will be met confidently by Richmond, who recently teamed brilliantly in the trial at Morningside, where the new forwards, McLeod, the Taranaki representative, and Mitchell, of Wairarapa, were conspicuous. Ponsonby, now coached by R. McIntyre, the ex-Ponsonby and Auckland representatives, are in the best of trim for their battle with Mount Albert, and the teams may provide a surprise or two. Newton will miss E. T. Brimble, who is at present in hospital, but the back division will include their promising centre, Sissons, with Dempsey as custodian. The team is being coached by George Morman, who captained the Rangers when they won the championship in 1927…Marists will present a powerful vanguard against City. The Rovers will have the services of moody, a big Bay of Plenty forward from Taneatua, and Potier, the South Auckland representative halfback, among several other alterations. Three Navy players, Fitzgerald, at centre, and Donaldson and Boyle, forwards, will appear for the green and golds”. The New Zealand Herald reported that “Richmond will be considerably strengthened by A. E. Cooke, the international, who retired last season, but has decided to play again. Manukau will field practically the same side as that last year, Hemi, Pickrang, and Brodrick all being available. It is doubtful whether Trevarthan, who is at present in the south, will turn out”.

After the first weekend of preliminary games the New Zealand Herald wrote a lengthy article on the personnel in each side. Manukau fielded “the same team as that last year. Its forwards included [Jack] Brodrick, Kawe, Whye, [Angus] Gault, and new players Phillips and Meredith, a hooker… [Steve] Watene will again lead the team… however, he may play in the forwards”. Jack Hemi appeared to have recovered from his leg injury of late last season, while Shalfoon, a newcomer to the team, showed a fine burst of speed on the wing. Hollis is a rugged type of five-eighths, and should get plenty of opportunities from Mahima, who will be the other halfback”. Other backs include Jack Broughton, an ex-Wairarapa representative three quarter. Richmond would field Jack Satherley at hooker, with Telford, Tetley, and Broadhead in the side with Metcalfe showing good form with Davis being another promising forward. Noel Bickerton and Roy Powell would be in the halves once again.

Marist had promoted a promising junior, Donovan who was clever on attack. Crocker was new at half back with Glover again at fullback. Haslam was again in the side, with Fitzgerald, Murdoch, and Bakalich in the backs. Their forwards would be made up of Anderson, Breed, Finlayson, and McGreal, along with Bogle and Donaldson who had been with the navy ship H.M.S. Philomel. Mount Albert had appeared to be the fittest looking team after the preliminary matches and would have a strong forward pack. Peterson, a Hawke's Bay forward who was with Mount Albert had transferred to Ponsonby with his place being filled by E. Satherley of Richmond. Hanson had been promoted from te 3rd grade side and Des Herring, Shadbolt, Bickerton, and Allen were all available. The backs would like be made up of Halsey, Wilf Hassan, and the three Schultz brothers.

The City Rovers side had lost Lou Brown but had gained J. Hapi. Hutchinson had been promoted from 3rd grade while Lynch joined the side from Matamata. Other backs included McLaughlin, Tawhai, and Rata with Cyril Wiberg at fullback. The forwards would include Spiro, Johnson, McCarthy, and moody (a rugby recruit). Raymond from Poverty Bay was in the forwards, while J. Webner from the Addington club in Christchurch had also joined the side. For North Shore Albions Vanich and Sterling had joined the side and looked promising. Jack Smith was a promoted junior who was fast and clever. Len Scott and Verdun Scott would be on the wings with Cowan at halfback. The forwards would be light, but very experienced consisted pf Simpson, Hunt, Hollows, E Scott, Rogers, and Barnett.

Newton were said to be the weakest looking of all the sides and had not trained well. Dempsey, Sissons, Young, and Brimble were all still in the side. The forwards would include Ellis, Cairns, proctor, Surtees, Beatty, and Ginders. Ponsonby would be fielding a young side. They were rumoured to be losing Brian Riley but he did ultimately play for them again. Miles was available at full back with Black at half back. Stockley, Arthur Kay, Frank Halloran, and Jones were all said to be playing again. New forwards included D. Keane, Blackman, and Eade.

Hawea Mataira and George Nēpia switch to rugby league
On June 8 it was reported in the New Zealand Herald that All Black and Hawke's Bay rugby representative Hawea Mataira was joining the City Rovers. He was a forward and had represented the All Blacks on their Australian tour in 1934. He also toured Australia with the Maori All Blacks in 1935 under the captaincy of George Nēpia.

Club visits to other centres
On June 19 six of the Auckland senior sides travelled throughout the North Island to play various local sides. Carlaw Park was unavailable that weekend as the ARL had made it available for the second soccer test match. Ponsonby travelled to Wellington, North Shore to Huntly, Mount Albert to New Plymouth, Marist to Whangarei, Manukau to Taneatua in the Bay of Plenty, and City to Tokaanu to play Taupo. The match between Taupo and City at Tokaanu was the first ever match of either oval ball code in the area.

Travel round

Senior B and second grades
At the annual meeting for the Papakura club Mr. A. Wilkie (chairman of the ARL Junior Board) said he “deplored the lack of good competition in the senior B grade last season…[and that] this had been the matter of serious consideration during the recess and the Junior Board had recommended to the Auckland league that the second grade be abolished. This would bring about ten teams into the senior B grade and tend to make the competition far more interesting in the coming season”. It was ultimately decided that the Senior B and 2nd Grades would be “amalgamated in order to increase competition between the open-weight grades”.

Carlaw trophy
Mr. Harold Walmsley donated a trophy in memory of James Carlaw which consisted of “inlaid New Zealand woods on three tiers with the pioneer administrator's photograph inset in the top square it is summounted by goal posts and a silver football. The trophy was to be dedicated to the annual representative Pakeha – Māori match.

Carlaw Park
At the control board meeting on March 17 it was reported that further improvements of the terraces at Carlaw Park were being carried out “for the convenience of patrons”. The terraces were “bitumised during the summer months”. At the time of the opening round it was reported that the league proposed to pad the entire length of the picket fence along the side line which ran on the city side of the field to prevent injury. Following the round 3 matches the grounds committee reported that the No. 2 ground was in “bad condition, and it was desirable to give the area some relief if possible”. The control board decided to defer the allocation of the City v Newton, and Marist v Richmond round 4 matches. In mid October it was announced that Carlaw park was to see the installation of floodlighting with a tender having been accepted. Chairman Campbell said “the board has been considering the question of night football for some time past… and we desire to make the ground a more attractive centre where athletic sports, boxing, wrestling, band contests and other attractions may be staged to the best advantage”. The introduction of the lighting would mean that four steel towers would need to be erected to “carry the clusters of fittings for the lights”. The work would take about two months to complete but would not interfere with the use of the park for public gatherings.

At an October meeting of the control board Mr. Culpan reported that a special South African grass which had been recommended by Mr. P. W. Day, manager of the Springboks, “had already been tried with success at Carlaw Park. The new grass was proving efficacious on bad parts of the playing areas.

Devonport United becomes North Shore Albion once again
At their annual club meeting on March 17 there was discussion of the name of the Devonport United club. “Owing to the district restriction implied by the name “Devonport”, and the fact that the team was always called “Shore”, Mr. H. Mann was supported in a proposal for a reversion to the club's old name, North Shore Albion Rugby League Club”. The name of Devonport United had been adopted when North Shore Albions merged with the Sunnyside club many years earlier and the Sunnyside members refused to accept the name of North Shore. The motion to change the name back to North Shore Albions was adopted.

Otahuhu ground issues
In 1936 the Otahuhu Borough Council had controversially granted exclusive use of Sturges Park to the Otahuhu Rugby Club despite strong protests from Auckland Rugby League via multiple delegations to speak to the council. Then in 1937 when the issue was being revisited the Auckland Rugby League submitted a tender where they would pay £30 per annum, plus give 33.33% of gross takings on match days minus costs and guaranteed a minimum payment of £55 a season. They would play at least four senior A matches and 12 senior B matches there with other first class junior matches. The Otahuhu Rugby Club tender was the same as the previous year which was a 20 percent share of the gate with a guarantee to play 12 senior games. The council had anticipated this would net £75 the previous year but it had not and the poor weather was said to be to blame. The council who included Mayor Charles Robert Petrie and was in fact the Otahuhu RL clubs patron, heard the tenders and then spent 15 minutes in special committee before deciding that they “had no option but to renew the lease with the rugby union according to last year's agreement” with legal advice confirming this opinion. Sturges Park was then leased to the Rugby Union for a period of 5 years.

State of Grey Lynn Park
In late July Northcote and Birkenhead complained in a letter to the ARL about the state of Grey Lynn Park after arriving to play Richmond. The letter said that they had feared they had arrived at the wrong place and instead had arrived in an area “reputed for bovine aromas and mudflats”. It was said to be “a sea of mud, eight or nine inches deep in some places, and the smell had to be experienced to be appreciated”. The letter went on to say that they “hoped that no further games be allotted to Grey Lynn Park until the city fathers install a drainage system”. The league decided not to arrange for any more matches at the park until it was in a proper condition for play.

Senior grade competitions
Following round 9 the ARL decided to rework the draw because Richmond was comfortably first (by 4 points with 5 matches to play) and they may be able to conclude the competition early.

At the ARL meeting on October 6 Wally Tittleton of the Richmond club was announced as being awarded a special trophy for the outstanding senior grade player. The award was made by the donor Mr. J.F.W. Dickson and was for consistently good play throughout the season. Tittleton had also won selection for Auckland and New Zealand during the year.

President of New Zealand Rugby League, Cyril Snedden donated a special trophy to John Anderson who registered a total of 148 points (or 154 according to the other report) and E. Bennett of Takapuna gave Jack Smith a trophy for scoring 132 points. It was said in an article later that he had scored 162 points. Though this would likely also include Auckland matches.

Senior A grade fixtures

Preliminary round 1
It was rumoured that Bert Cooke was going to come out of retirement to play again for Richmond whoever he did not appear in their first practice match.

Preliminary round 2
Bill Schultz of Mount Albert fractured his leg in their match with City. Charles Dunne also of Mount Albert broke his jaw and both players were taken to Auckland Hospital. Wilf Hassan injured his shoulder badly and was set to miss several weeks. Donald Fraser was concussed while playing for Newton.

Fox Memorial standings
{|
|-
|

Fox Memorial results

Round 1
Bert Cooke played and was said to be “superlative” however he was late tackled and was limping at the end of the game. This was to be his last ever rugby league appearance. He began coaching the North Shore rugby senior side for the remainder of the year.

Round 2
Frank Thompson refereed his 50th 1st grade match when he had control of the Mt Albert - City match. He became the 7th referee to achieve this feat.

Round 3
A week after Frank Thompson achieved the feat, Wilfred Simpson became the 8th Auckland Rugby League referee to referee 50 matches between first grade sides when Richmond played City.

Round 4
In Marists heavy defeat at the hands of Richmond they lost Glover and Gordon Midgley to injury and played most of the second half with 11 players. The City v Newton match was originally supposed to be played at Carlaw Park but after the number 2 field was declared in a poor state the match was moved to Glen Eden.

Round 5
The match between Richmond and Newton was played at Fowld's Park to raise money for the King George V. Memorial Fund. The game was ceremonially kicked off by the Mayor of Mount Albert, Mr. W.A. Anderson.

Round 6

Round 7
1934 All Black Hawea Mataira switched codes and made his debut appearance for Manukau. Tom Chase and Rangi Chase both had also switched codes and debuted for Manukau also. Tom had been a representative player for Wanganui and a Māori All Black, while his younger brother Rangi had also played 3 matches for Wanganui in 1936. All three would go on to represent New Zealand. Rangi scored 3 tries and kicked a drop goal in his first appearance for Manukau.

Round 8
Round 8 was initially scheduled to be played on June 26 but all rugby league in Auckland, along with several other outdoor sports was cancelled due to poor weather. Frank Pickrang transferred from Manukau to Ponsonby and made his debut for his new side. He had been trying to move for some time but chose to stand down due to transfer difficulties. Joining him at Ponsonby at the same time was fellow Kiwi, Joe Cootes who was transferring from Wellington.

Round 9

Round 10

Round 11

Round 12

Round 13

Round 14

Roope Rooster (knockout competition)

Round 1

Semi finals

Final

Phelan Shield

Round 1

Semi finals
In the semi final between City and Mt Albert, S. Billman became the 9th referee to officiate in 50 matches between first grade sides in Auckland Rugby League history.

Final

Stormont Shield
John Anderson capped a truly remarkable point scoring season by scoring all 12 of Marist's points, made up of 2 tries, a conversion, a penalty, and a drop goal. It was Marist's 4th Stormont Shield win with the previous being in 1928, 1929, and 1932. The win denied Richmond what would have been their 4th straight Stormont Shield victory. At the conclusion of the match Mr. A. Stormont, the father of Bill Stormont who the trophy was named in honour of after his death mid season in 1925 presented the Marist players with medals.

Top try scorers and point scorers
The point scoring lists are compiled from matches played in the Fox Memorial, Roope Rooster, Phelan Shield and Stormont Shield matches which all first grade sides were eligible for competing in (provided they avoided elimination from the knock out competitions). The top point scorer was once again John Anderson. He scored 143 points in the aforementioned competitive matches and also scored in preliminary matches and in a Marist tour match which were not included in his statistics. Jack Smith finished second with 87 points. Both players would go on to represent New Zealand in 1938. The top try scorer was William McCallum for Mount Albert who was in his first season for them.

Senior reserve competitions
There were several rounds of the senior reserve grade competition that had no results reported. These were rounds 7 where only 1 result was reported, and rounds 11, 13, and 14 where no results were reported at all. It is possible that Richmond Rovers had won the competition by the latter stages and so the fixtures became optional and possibly not played or of no championship significance and so therefore not reported by club officials. The Auckland Rugby League would often conclude competitions prematurely if a champion had already been found.

Norton Cup standings 
{|
|-
|

Norton Cup fixtures

Stallard Cup knockout competition

Senior B grade competitions

Sharman Cup standings
{|
|-
|

Sharman Cup fixtures
The competition was won by Papakura who finished with a 14 win, 1 loss record. Fixtures were listed each week in The New Zealand Herald and Auckland Star however results were often not published. Following round 14 the Auckland Star published the points table to that point which indicated who the victors in several of the unreported matches were.

Following their round 2 match Manukau were advised that their team was out of order. They then defaulted their round 3 match after being given one more week to get their team in order before resuming in round 4. Glenora withdrew from the competition after defaulting in round 3. The round 6 loss by Papakura was their first loss for 3 seasons. In about round 15 both Manukau and Mount Albert withdrew from the competition as they were no longer listed in any fixtures form this point. At the September 7 meeting Papakura were congratulated on winning the Senior B competition. They had scored 304 points during the competition and only conceded 72.

Walmsley Shield knockout competition
Manukau and Mount Albert did not enter teams. Newton was initially drawn to play Papakura in round 1 but withdrew and instead Papakura travelled to Huntly to play the local side instead. Glenora entered a team but were knocked out in the first round by Point Chevalier. R.V. and Northcote & Birkenhead received bye's in round 1. Richmond drew with Green Lane in round 1 which forced the teams into a replay the following weekend which Green Lane won. Papakura had a bye in this round. Papakura defeated Point Chevalier in the 3rd weekend of the competition and so joined Green Lane in the final with Papakura running out 19-7 winners.

Other Club Matches and Lower Grades

Senior club matches

Ponsonby XIII v Huntly
On August 28 a Ponsonby XIII played Huntly at Swanson in West Auckland. A shield was presented to the winners (Ponsonby) after the match by Mr. L. Adams to the Ponsonby captain for the day, Stan Prentice, the former New Zealand international and Richmond club player. The shield had been donated by Mr. I. Culpan.

Richmond reserves v Kamo
The Richmond reserve side travelled to Whangarei to play the Northland senior club champions on August 28. The Richmond side won by 27 points to 17.

Lower grade competitions
There were 5 lower grades in 1937 (Third Grade to Seventh Grade). This was a reduction of 1 on the previous season as the Second Grade was forced into the Senior B grade. There were an additional 3 schoolboy grades (Junior, Intermediate, and Senior).

Richmond Rovers once again won the Davis Points Shield for winning the most points through all club teams. City Rovers finished runners up. Papakura won the Tracy Inglis points trophy for junior clubs with Otahuhu runners up.
 
Grades and teams were as follows with the winning team in bold:
Third Grade Section 1: Ellerslie United, Marist Old Boys, Mount Albert United, North Shore Albions, Otahuhu, Papakura A, and R.V. (Harvey and Sons Ltd). Section 2: City Rovers, Glenora, Manukau Rovers, Papakura B, Point Chevalier, and Richmond Rovers. (Otahuhu and Richmond won their respective sections before meeting in the final which Otahuhu won 13 to 6. Richmond were awarded the Walker Cup for finishing runner up. Ellerslie won the third grade knockout competition).
Fourth Grade: Ellerslie United, Glenora, North Shore Albions, Northcote & Birkenhead Ramblers, Ponsonby United, Richmond Rovers (Ellerslie played Richmond in the championship final with Richmond winning 10-5).
Fifth Grade: Avondale, City Rovers, Ellerslie United, North Shore Albions, Northcote & Birkenhead Ramblers, Otahuhu, Papakura, Richmond Rovers (Otahuhu beat Richmond 17-5 in the championship final) with City winning the fifth grade knockout competition.
Sixth Grade:  City Rovers, Green Lane, Mount Albert United, Papakura, Point Chevalier, and Richmond Rovers (City won the sixth grade championship ahead of Green Lane)
Seventh Grade: Glenora, North Shore Albions, Otahuhu, Ponsonby United, Richmond Rovers (runner up)
Schoolboy Grades
Junior: Avondale Convent, Balmoral, Ellerslie, George Courts A, George Courts B, Green Lane, Manukau, Marist, Mount Albert, Newton A, Newton B, North Shore, Northcote, Point Chevalier, Ponsonby, Richmond (Newton A beat Northcote 6-3 in the championship final).

Intermediate: Avondale, Balmoral, Ellerslie, Marist, Mount Albert, Newton, North Shore, Northcote, Otahuhu, Ponsonby, Point Chevalier, Richmond (Avondale beat Ponsonby 10-5 in the championship final).

Senior: Avondale Convent, Ellerslie, Manukau, Marist, Mount Albert, Newton, Northcote, Point Chevalier, Richmond, (Green Lane withdrew during the season)

Auckland representative team
Hec Brisbane was named the Auckland selector for the season.

Auckland (Pākēha) v Auckland Māori (Tamaki)
The opening representative match of the season was played on Coronation Day. For all intents and purposes the Auckland team was the Auckland Pākēha team. Although they were named "Auckland" they have been renamed Auckland Pākēha as that is what they came to be known as from 1938 onwards in matches against Auckland Māori.

Auckland v South Auckland (Waikato)
Auckland played two matches on the same day against South Auckland (Waikato), and Taranaki. They won both matches. Neither was listed as an A or B team and both sides contained a large number of past, current, or future New Zealand international players. Former Ponsonby player, Kenneth Peckham who was now playing in the Waikato dislocated his right shoulder while playing for South Auckland and was taken to Auckland Hospital.

Auckland v Taranaki

Auckland v New Zealand Māori (Max Jaffe Cup)
The New Zealand Māori team was very similar to the one which had defeated Australia earlier in the season. The match was played as part of a Gala Day to raise money for injured players. George Nēpia traveled up from Gisborne to play in the match. Auckland was well below strength with several players out injured.

Auckland representative matches played and scorers

Auckland Māori (Tamaki) representative season
In addition to their loss to Auckland, the Auckland Māori side played in two other matches against Waikato Māori and North Auckland Māori.

Auckland Māori (Tamaki) v Waikato Māori (Waitangi Shield)

Auckland Māori (Tamaki) v North Auckland Māori (Waitangi Shield)

Tāmaki (Auckland Māori) representative matches played and scorers

Annual General Meetings and Club News
Auckland Rugby League Junior Management Committee They held their annual meeting on March 23 with Mr. D. Wilkie presiding. Their report noted that 60 teams took part in the junior grade competitions. A club ballot for members of the executive board resulted in the reappointment of Messrs. D. Wilkie, E. Chapman, A. Hopkinson, C. Howe, I. Stonex, R. Short, and F’ Thompson, with Mr. E. McNamara as a new member. The ninth member saw a tie between R, Parr and T. Carey and a special vote was called for by April 6. When the vote was held Mr. Parr was elected. Mr. Wilkie was re-elected chairman, and Mr. W. F. Clarke honorary secretary of the board. It was noted that Mr. George Taylor, a member of the board had had to resign owing to ill-health, and to Mr. Chirmside. Two new members were later appointed in Mr. Skinner (Referees’ Association), and Mr. McNamara (ex-secretary of the Glenora Club). At their May 4 meeting twenty-two transfers were approved, and 108 new players were registered. At their May 18 meeting they were notified by the Glenora club that they had withdrawn their Senior B team (following the 3rd round). It appears that they had not taken the field at all as no results were reported in any of the previous weekends. Manukau were given one more week to get their teams in order.

Auckland Rugby League School Management Committee: Their 11th annual report stated that 30 teams had entered competition in 1936 which was an increase of eleven on the previous year. New teams were fielded by the Ponsonby, Newton, Manukau, and Mount Albert clubs. At their annual meeting on March 23 Mr. R. E. Newport presided. The following were elected as officers:- patron, Dr. M. G. Pezaro; president, Mr. Newport; secretary, Mr. Rout; executive committee, Messrs., A. Stanley (chairman), J. Armstrong, Foster, Jenkinson, Rowe, Rose Thompson, and H. Green. On the 19th of April at their management meeting they received a record number of nominations with 8 teams entering the senior grade, 15 in the intermediate grade, and 17 for the junior grade.

Auckland Rugby League Referees Association Their annual meeting was held in the grandstand rooms at Carlaw Park in late March. Mr. L. S. Bull presided and he welcomed a number of prospective members. Their report stated that for the 1936 season there were 37 active referees and four official line umpires which constituted a record for the code in Auckland. There had been an improved standard of officiating and less criticism of them. Mr. G. Kelly was congratulated on winning the Carey Cup for the most improved referee. The following officers were elected:- president, Mr. L. S. Bull; vice president, Mr. J. G. McCowatt; appointment board delegate, Mr. A. Rae; control board, Mr. W. Mincham; junior management delegate, Mr. T. Skinner; official critic, Mr. A. Sanders; examination committee, Messrs. J. Hammond and A. Sanders; executive committee, Messrs, Maurice Wetherill, M. Renton, and G. Kelly; honorary secretary, Mr. Wilfred Simpson; honorary treasurer, Mr. A. Chapman; auditor, Mr. Percy Rogers; social committee, Messrs, R. Otto, Mincham, Wetherill, and Sanders. At the ARL Referees’ association meeting on April 27 the appointment of Mr. R. Benson as the elected representative of the control board was well received. On July 3 the Auckland Rugby League Referees Association held a reunion at the Tiffin dining rooms. Over 50 “50 pioneers, one of whom controlled matches 29 years ago”, were included in an attendance of over 100 with Mr. L. E. Bull presiding.

City Rovers Held their annual meeting on March 18 with Ernie Asher acknowledged his re-election as hon. secretary for the 25th consecutive year. Mr. Ted Phelan was re-elected club auditor which was a position he had held for over 20 years. C. Raynes was also re-elected to office and had been involved with the club for 10 years but had been connected to rugby league in Auckland since 1907. He had been a player, coach, and trainer with the North Shore Albions, Athletics, Ponsonby, and Richmond before joining City. Mr. George Hunt was presiding at the annual meeting and was pleased with the large attendance. Lou Brown won Mr. Hunt's gold medal for the best back and he was also congratulated on his “display against the Englishmen”. Stan Clark won the award for best forward, and Cyril Wiberg received the A.A. Smith Cup and medal as the most improved player. I. Thompson and K. Belwood were recognised for practice attendances in the senior reserves. The fourth grade was acknowledged for being undefeated and scoring 438 points for and just 22 against. Mr. C. Olsen presented a framed photograph of the side for the teams club room at Carlaw Park. The following officers were elected:- patron, Mr. C. Raynes; president, Mr. George Hunt; vide-presidents, same as last year, with several additions; hon. secretary, Mr. Ernie Asher; assistant, Mr. J. Counihan; club captain, Mr. J. Ragg; auditor, Mr. Ted Phelan. The committee was composed of junior and senior grade nominated representatives, Messrs. J. L. O’Sullivan, R. Turner, S. Dickey, and T. Chernside and the executive officers. They held their annual picnic at Motuihi on October 17. Many events were held at it and S. Dickie came first in the club championship race with J. Ragg in second. D. Hutchinson came first in the senior grade handicap followed by L. Wehner. They held their prize giving on November 24 at the Masonic Hall on Eden Terrace with the presentation of trophies. President George Hunt congratulated the sixth grade team who won the championship and knockout honours. D Hutchinson won the miniature cup for the most consistent player. The following were other trophies presented: Reserve Grade – A. Potier, Third Grade – J. Ryan (most consistent 1936–37), R. Gibson, S. Trainer, and K. Speir (most improved), and I Hatton (exemplary conduct on the field). The third grade team was runner-up in the championship and winner of the knockout competition and received the Raynes Cup for the best average of points among the juniors. Sixth grade – R. price (most improved), B. Tracey (good conduct), A Mitchell (best back), H. Gordon (best forward), and C. Vasey (best all-round player). They held their annual meeting prior to the end of the year to elect officers for the 1938 season. It was stated that they had assets of over £50. They had finished runners up for the Davis Points Shield. Their members expressed their appreciation of Ernie Asher who was in his 28th year as secretary, and having been treasurer since the inception of the club. The following officers were elected: patron, Mr. C. Raynes; president, Mr. George Hunt; vice presidents, same as last year, with power to add; club captain, Mr. J. Ragg; committee, Messrs. J. O’Sullivan, T Chermside, S. Belsham, and W. Johnson, with the balance to be elected by grade teams; secretary and treasurer, Mr. Ernie Asher.

Ellerslie United League Football Club On February 3 the Ellerslie Town Board met and discussed the improvements made to the recreation reserve and it was recommended that “two extra flood-lights be installed at a cost of £35 10/, and an ordinary light in the dressing shed. It also urged that the fence on the northern side be set back. Rugby league football was given use of the ground on alternate Saturdays from May 1 for £9. They held their annual meeting in the Parish Hall, Ellerslie with Mr. J. McInnarney presiding over the largest attendance “for some years”. They commented on the four teams which the club fielded in 1936 including the third grade team who had been coached by Charles Gregory and won the championship. The club hoped to enter teams in the senior B, third, fourth, and seventh grades, and also two schoolboy sides. The third grade side were presented caps and the R. Benson trophy. The following officers were elected: patron, Mr. A. G. Osborne, M.P.; president, Mr. J. McInnarney; vice-presidents, Messrs. R. H. McIsaac, A. Chapman, J. Court and H. McNaughton, with power to add; club captain, F. Chapman; committee, Messrs. G. Skeen (chairman), J. Pinches, A. Tobin, R. Hunter, T. Emery, J. Wilson, W. Miller, M. Campbell, H. Thomas, A. Strong; secretary and treasurer, Mr. G. Whaley; auditors, Messrs. J. Carr and O. D. Slye. The club held its annual schoolboy picnic on the 16th of October at Eastern beach. Taylor won the senior 100 yards. they held their annual full club picnic also on Eastern Beach at the end of November. F. Chapman won the club handicap race.

Glenora Rugby League Football Club Glenora requested that a senior match be played at Glen Eden after one had been played there in 1936. Prior to the round 4 matches the Carlaw Park ground staff informed the league that the No.2 field was in a bad condition. As a result, the control board decided to just play 1 match on it and move the City v Newton senior match to Glen Eden. The Glenora club wrote to the Junior Board thanking them for playing the match there. On September 28 at the ARL junior management meeting Mr. N. Robertson was awarded a medal for the most sportsmanlike player in the third grade competition. The medal was donated by Mr. J. F. W. Dickson. Glenora's third grade team played a Ngaruawahia side at Carlaw Park as one of the curtain raiser matches to the Stormont Shield final.

Green Lane Rugby League Club On April 20 the Junior management received with regret the resignation of the Green lane secretary, Mr. A. W. Wilson. The management committee decided to write a letter of thanks to the Auckland Racing Club for the use of its ground. Mr. F. Gadd was appointed the Green Lane delegate to succeed Mr. Kane who had resigned.

Manukau Rugby League Club They held their annual meeting in late March with a large attendance estimated at 250. Mr. S. W. House made complimentary reference to the success of the senior team who had won the Fox Memorial the previous season. Steve Watene was congratulated on his selection as captain of New Zealand, as were Thomas Trevarthan, and Frank Pickrang for there selection. Watene was awarded the W. Cuthbert trophy as the best Auckland match player against England, and Pickrang was awarded the J. F. W. Dickson medal as the most improved Auckland player. The following officers were elected:-patron, Mr. A. G. Osborne, M.P.; vice patron, Mr. J. Park, Mayor of Onehunga; president, Mr. S. W. House; committee, Messrs. C. Randrup, A. Grant, E. Rewiti, H. Buckton, D. Williams, D. Sims and C. Pullen; club captain, Mr. A. G. Bates; secretary, Mr. Steve Watene; treasurer, Mr. A. Walton. It was said after their opening preliminary match that they turned out in a completely new uniform of blue and white instead of the black and white of the previous season. The club held its annual meeting on November 15 at the Returned Soldiers Hall in Onehunga. They had a credit balance of £51. Mr C. Randrup said the idea of holding the annual meeting at this time “was to enable early preparation for next season”. The following officers were elected: patron, Mr. A. G. Osborne, M.P.; president, Mr. S. W. House; committee, Messrs. C. Randrup, E. Reweti, J. W. Watson; secretary, Mr. Allen Porter; treasurer, Mr. A. Walton; auditor, Mr. N. A. Ching. The vice-presidents, with power to add, were also elected.

Marist Old Boys League Football Club Held their annual meeting at King George's Hall in Mount Albert on March 10 at 7:30pm. Their annual report which was presented to the ARL on May 12. It was scathing of the performance and effort of many of its sides who were “hopelessly beaten last season, due to a lack of enthusiasm by the players and by those in charge of them. The senior team were the worst offenders, and their failure to show a proper example to the younger members in the matter of attendance at practice caused the executive much concern”. The outgoing committee recommended that players have to account for their absence at Tuesday and Thursday trainings. The following players were elected as follows: patron, His Lordship Bishop Liston; president, Mr. Joe Sayegh, committee (acting with coaches and ex-officio officers), Messrs. J. Ball, W. Maddigan, G. Copas, P. Hughes, and F Webberley; hon. secretary, Mr. Jack Kirwan; hon. treasurer, Mr. P Fletcher; club captain, Mr. Jim Laird (vice Mr. Hec Brisbane; delegate to junior management, Mr. F. Thompson; to school management, Mr. G. Foster; auditors, Messrs. O. H. Johnson and J. F. Hollinrake; hon masseurs, Messrs. G. Duffy and D. Petty.

Mount Albert Rugby League Football Club held their ninth annual meeting on March 10. The club report said that they had had over 140 players spread across several teams in 1936. The Mount Albert Borough Council had erected an up-to-date dressing shed at Fowlds Park training ground along with flood lighting for training. The annual cup given by vice patron, Mr. A. S. Richards, M.P. for the most conscientious player in any grade, went to L. Slattery, of the second grade team. Mr. H. Cottrell's medal for most improved senior was won by J Schultz, Mrs. Parvin's medal for most consistent reserve player went to E. Dunne, and Mrs Hanlon's medal for the best all-rounder in the seconds to J. Patterson. A Sumich won the cup give for the best schoolboy. The club reported a credit balance of £102 5/. Over 200 players and supporters attended their annual meeting with Mr. A. C. Gallagher presiding. They decided to hold a “district queen carnival in conjunction with the bowling club and local branch of the R.S.A.”. The following officers were elected as follows:- patron, the Mayor (Mr. Henry Albert Anderson); vice-patron, Mr. Arthur Shapton Richards, M.P., president Mr. A. C. Gallagher; vice presidents, same as last year with power to add; secretary, Mr. H. G. Shaw; assistant, Mr. R. Larson; treasurer, Mr. W. Schultz; club captain, Mr. F. Martin; auditor, Mr. S. C. Johnston. On April 24 Mount Albert held a gala day sports meeting in aid of the Queen Carnival which was being run for the benefit of the Mount Albert RL club, the Ex-Servicemen's Club, and the Mount Albert Bowling Club. A seven-a-side football competition for schoolboys, wrestling displays, fancy dress and other novelty events would be held along with a match between Mount Albert seniors against Richmond. In mid May Mount Albert signed J. Tristram who was an All Black trialist in 1936. He weighed 13.5st and had previously played for the Frankton club and Waikato. Mount Albert held a dance organised by their committee in aid of the carnival funds on June 14. It was held at the Peter Pan Cabaret.

Newton Rangers Football Club held their annual meeting at the Y.M.C.A. Patron Mr. M. Hooper congratulated the club on its sound progress and referred to the loss to Te Awamutu of the chairman Mr. Roy C. Baddeley. After 26 years of service Mr. G. Steven was made a life member. The chairman on behalf of the donor, Mr. Cloke, presented a blazer to Athol Massey for “his fine leadership and example as captain of the third grade A team”. The following officers were elected: patron, Mr. M. Hooper; vice-patron, Mr. W. Monteith; president, the hon. W. E. Parry; vice presidents, same as last year, with power to add; secretary and assistant, Messrs. E. W. Cloke and G Matthews; treasurer, Mr. P. Henry; committee, Messrs. G Steven, J. F. Dyer, N. Reston, K. Grantley, and C. Moyle. On June 30 at the board of control meeting the suspension of A. Nathan for an off field incident during the previous season was uplifted after “strong representations from Newton Rangers”. The incident the previous season had dragged on as several efforts were made to appeal the decision for weeks and months after the incident.

North Shore Albions On January 9 ‘Devonport’ held a dance at the Masonic Hall in Devonport organised by the Junior Rugby League. The venue was decorated in the club colours of green and white. They held another similar event in early February. At their annual club meeting on March 17 Mr. Archie Ferguson presided. There was discussion of the name of the club. “Owing to the district restriction implied by the name “Devonport”, and the fact that the team was always called “Shore”, Mr. H. Mann was supported in a proposal for a reversion to the club's old name, North Shore Albion Rugby League Club”. The name of Devonport United had been adopted when North Shore Albions merged with the Sunnyside club many years earlier and the Sunnyside members refused to accept the name of North Shore. The motion to change the name back to North Shore Albions was adopted. Club trophies were presented to the following players: W. Thompson (reserves), J. Smith and L. Brown (third grade), P. McCavery and F Hines (fourths), G. Gilbert and F. Calderbank (fifths), and G. Drough (schoolboys). Len Scott was congratulated on his New Zealand selection. The following officers were elected:- patron, Captain Meiklejohn; vice patrons, Messrs. Mr. J. Donald and E. Kelly; president, Mr. Archie Ferguson; vice presidents, same as last year, with several new nominations; club captain, Mr. F. Bolger; schoolboy delegate, Mr. V. Rose; hon secretary and treasurer, Mr. M. Coghlan; hon auditor, Mr. E. Ford; committee, Messrs. Mann, Foster, Langton, Williams, Seagar, and Johnson.

Northcote and Birkenhead Ramblers Football Club Northcote sent a request to the Junior Management Committee on May 4 asking that a senior match be played in the suburb in aid of the King George V. Memorial Fund on the municipal ground which would be free of charge for the occasion. The application was referred to the control board. On September 21 the Northcote Borough Council received a letter from the Northcote club expressing “appreciation of the facilities provided for practice and matches at the Municipal ground in Stafford Road where the conditions were far superior to the grounds played on in and about Auckland City.

Otahuhu Rovers Rugby League Football Club At the Otahuhu Borough Council meeting on March 8 the use of Sturges Park in Otahuhu was discussed. The ARL asked for all football codes to be considered (after the Otahuhu RL club was denied use of the ground controversially in 1936). The ARL suggested that the “opportunity be given to all codes to tender for the ground for the whole season, or that the Otahuhu Council should follow the lead of other local bodies and make a flat charge for the ground and allot it on a pro rata basis. The council decided to invite representatives of the rugby league to attend a special meeting on March 10 to state their proposals. At the twenty sixth annual meeting of the Otahuhu Rugby League Football Club Mr. J. Clark presided. The seventh grade players were presented with caps in honour of winning their championship. The club had also won the points shield for junior clubs. The following officers were elected:- patron, Mr. Charles Robert Petrie, M.P.; president Mr. J. Nicholson; vice presidents, same as last year, with several additions, chairman, Mr. J. Clark; hon secretary, Mr. W. Hart; hon treasurer, Mr. Ivan Kelly; committee, Messrs. Docherty, C. Clarke, O. McManus, M. Harris, T. Auckram, W. Gordon, J. Porteous, T. Mann, and W. G. Bright. The club nominated seven teams for the 1937 season. In mid October the Otahuhu Rovers held a social evening organised largely by the ladies’ committee to celebrate the third and fifth grade teams who won their championships. There were approximately 300 people in attendance at the Otahuhu Public Hall. Mr. H. T. Clements presented the teams with caps for their success. A trophy for the most conscientious seventh grade player was won by M. Miles, and E. McManus won the Porteous Medal for the best schoolboy player. In September the Otahuhu third grade team travelled to Taneatua and played the Bay of Plenty juniors, winning 28–6.

Papakura Rugby League Football Club Papakura held a dance on January 26 at the Regent Theatre with a large attendance present estimated at 450. The Senior B team which won the Sharman Cup and Walmsley Shield in 1936 was presented with their caps by manager Les McVeagh. Captain Gordon Wilson paid tribute to vice-captain Mr. E. Pope who “had not missed a match for five seasons, and during that time he had played in 95 games”. They held their 6th annual meeting on March 4 with Mr. Gordon Wilson presiding before around 70. The annual report showed expenditure of £136 and a credit balance of £80 17s 5d. The amount spent on transport was £55. The following officers were elected: patron, Mr. Hugh A. Pollock; president Mr Les McVeagh; vice presidents, Messrs S. H. Godden, Allan McGregor, A Richardson, F. J. Verner, V Hardwick, and C Chamberlain; executive committee Messrs G. Wilson, V and E Ashby, W.K. Francis jun., W. Elliot, N. Widdowson and R. S. Williams; grounds Messrs F. Wells, A Schwartsfeger, A Hill and R Bates; social Messrs E Searle, M Wright, R Hammond and A McGuiness; treasurer Mr R Walsh; club captain, Mr Frank Osborne; physicians, Dr. G. W. Lock and Dr. Warren Young; auditor Mr J Beams. They held a dance at the Regent Theatre on March 2. In April the club held two practice matches at Prince Edward Park with J. Fogarty, an ex-South Auckland and Manukau Rugby Union representative appearing. Papakura intended on fielding five teams in various grades. The club saw an increase of their ground rental at Prince Edward Park of £5 to £10 at the Papakura Town Board meeting in mid April. Mr. H. D. Spinley said “he was aware that ground rents in Auckland had increased, but to raise the charge” by that amount was “not playing the game” with the League club when compared with the board's proposal to charge the Rugby union club £1 1s for the railway reserve. Mr. D. Weir replied “if the railway reserve was in the same condition as prince Edward Park it, too would be worth £10, but the reserve is rough and has not the same facilities as the park. A deputation was sent to a Papakura Town Board's meeting 2 weeks later however the board stood by their decision after stating that they were spending more on the ground than they were receiving from the club including grass cutting, fence constructions, goal posts, flood lighting and installing a cold shower. The Manurewa Town Board decided on April 19 that it would grant rugby league the use of Jellicoe Park until 3pm on Saturday's and rugby the use of it beyond this hour. The Papakura club enquired with the council as to where the floodlights were that we supposed to be installed at Prince Edward Park but whose whereabouts were unknown. On October 15 the club gave a complimentary dinner to the members of the senior B team in honour of their achievements. The dinner was held in Pegler's building with “a good number of members [making] the journey to Manurewa, where they were joined by Manurewa supporters. Les McVeigh, the president of the club welcomed the chairman of the Auckland junior control board, Mr. D. Wilkie, secretary Mr. M. W. Clarke, Mr. I. Stonex, assistant secretary, and also Mr. J. Edwards who was representing the Manurewa Town Board. Norman Widdowson thanked the league for all their assistance to the club. Wilkie replied that they always looked forward to attending the Papakura club functions and that the Papakura club was the main reason the senior B grade even existed. He also said that there was a possibility of the club moving to the senior A grade and that as a club they were ranked “among the first three clubs in Auckland”. Clarke said he was of the opinion that “Papakura was the next club to get among the senior clubs, …[and that the club should] not supply players to city clubs but keep them in its own club and territory”. They held their annual club picnic at McNicol's farm at Clevedon on December 12 with over 400 in attendance. 10 lorries were required to transport everybody there. I. Wilson won the senior B 100 yard race.

Point Chevalier League Football Club
Ponsonby United Football Club held their annual meeting on February 22. There was a “good attendance of players and supporters present with Mr. R. Francis presiding. The club report said that the acquisition of a social hall and clubrooms had proved a big success during the previous season. The senior team was presented with the Stuart Cup for being the most successful team in the club after they won the Phelan Shield in the knockout competition. They had been coached by Bert Cooke. The club was showing a “substantial profit, and assets amounted to £488, while there were no liabilities”. The following officers were elected; Patron, Mr A. Adams; president, Mr F Harrison; executive committee, Messrs R Francis, J Armstrong, A Barnett, Frank Delgrosso, D Maloney; honorary secretary, Mr M Campbell, honorary treasurer Mr L Adams; selector and coach, Mr Bert Cooke; club captain, A McIntyre, with twenty three vice-presidents re-elected. It was later rumoured that Cooke would not coach Ponsonby and would in fact coach a rugby union club side but this was denied at the Auckland Control Board meeting of March 17. It was then reported that he was going to be an honorary ‘coach’ for the North Shore Rugby Football Club but was still the official coach of Ponsonby Rugby League Club.

Richmond Rovers Football Club held their 23rd annual meeting at the Gaiety Hall in Grey Lynn on March 2 with Mr B.W. Davis presiding. Mention was made of the number of teams the club fielded in the previous season and the fact that they retained the Davis Points Shield. Congratulations was extended to R Powell, W Tittleton, and E Mincham on their selection in the New Zealand side. The club had assets worth £216 17/ and had a credit balance of £143 7/. Club captain A. Hyland was retiring and gave a speech on their various teams and awarded the Harry Johns Memorial Cup to the sixth grade winners. Mr W. Mincham's special cap for goal-kicking was awarded to E. McCarthy (seventh grade), who kicked 40 goals in 17 matches. Tribute was also paid to Mr. W.A. Swift, who had been associated with the club for 21 years as a player and as an official and he was gifted a “substantial piece of furniture”. The following officers were elected: patron, Mr. W.J. Holdsworth; vice-patron, Mr. J. Redwood, sen; president, Mr. B. W. Davis; vice-presidents, same as last year, with three new nominations; chairman, Mr. W. A. Swift; honorary secretary and treasurer, Mr W.R. Dick; club captain, Mr. Ralph Jenkinson; manager of senior team, Mr. A. Hyland; schools’ delegate, Mr. C. Rowe; auditor, Mr. J.A. Redwood. In June the Richmond club made enquiries with regards to touring New South Wales but was told it was unlikely as the league there could not accommodate them on the desired dates. The trip was cancelled entirely in mid July after the dates suggested were considered too late for Richmond to be able to earn enough money to cover their expenses.

R.V. Rugby League Football Club Held their annual meeting in early March. They were a company team for Harvey and Sons. Harvey later merged and became part of Carter Holt Harvey. The following officers were elected: Chairman, Mr. E Muller; patron, Mr. A.G. Harvey; vice presidents, Messrs, D. Harvey, W. Harvey sen, W. Harvey jun, A Harvey jun, C Hamilton, J. McGeehan, E Griffiths, W. Rabbidge, C. Smith, R. Parr, A. Cloke; secretary, Mr. G Dines; treasurer, Mr. F.W. Day; selector coaches, Mr. T. Shearer (second grade), and Mr. E. Knight (third grade); committee to represent each factory, Messrs, R. Parr and E Knight (Victoria Street), Messrs T. Shearer and J. Salter (Albert Street), Messrs. W. Halverson and A. Brown (King's Drive); delegate, Mr. R. Parr; deputy delegate, Mr. G. Dines; official linesmen, Messrs, J. Salter (second grade), and W. Halverson (third grade).

Senior grade registrations and transfers
At North Shore Albions annual meeting on March 17 they stated that a number of new players were enrolled, including Ivor Stirling of Northland.

At the board of control meeting on April 14 the following senior registrations were approved, Transfers: Cliff Satherley from Richmond to Mount Albert; R.H. Ferrall from Mount Albert to Newton; C Cairns, Pukemiro to Mount Albert; R McGreal, Ngaruawahia to Marist (subject to approval by the New Zealand Council. On April 20 C.C. Murton was transferred from Ellersie 3rd grade to Manukau seniors. On April 21 ten players were registered with two of them including L.C. Bain a well known Otago runner and ex-member of the Union club in Dunedin, and William J. McCallum, a North Auckland athlete. Transfers were: D.E. Keane from Marist to Ponsonby. S.W. Sherson was reinstated with E Tremain (South Auckland) being cleared to join North Shore.
 
On May 5 the following transfers were granted:- J.W. Donald from North Shore Albions to City Rovers; C.R. Phillips from Otahuhu senior B to Manukau; J. Stannaway, Otahuhu senior B to Marist reserves; E.W.H. Barfoot, Marist reserves to Ponsonby reserves; J Shadbolt, Newton reserves to Glenora; P. Awhitu and P. Kauhoa, City to R.V; K Nicolson, Richmond thirds to Marist reserves; F Deason, Ponsonby reserves to R.V. On May 12 the following registrations were granted: H. Crook and Frederick Hollis with Newton, Norman F. Drew with Mount Albert, and P. C. N. Strickland with Marist. The following were transferred: H. Crook (North Shore to Newton), G Newton (Petone to Newton). While Alf Broadhead of Richmond was cleared to play in Wellington subject to approval by the New Zealand Council. On May 17 P Wickham and A McDonald were regraded from Glenora Senior B to 3rd grade. On May 19 the following transfers were granted: H. E. Neale (Papakura to Ponsonby reserves), E. Donovan (Marist to City reserves), Walter Preston (Mount Albert to Newton reserves). T.C.G. Pierce (One Tree Hill Point Club in Whangarei to Newton reserves), and Noel Messenger (Central Club in Wellington to Newton). E Tackle was regraded from North Shore reserves to Richmond senior B. James Tristram from the Waikato was registered with Mount Albert while M.J.L. West was reinstated (he had previously played with Ellerslie. At the meeting of the junior management on May 25 A. McDonald was regraded from Glenora senior B to 3rd grade as was S.G. Johnson of Otahuhu. On May 26 the following players were registered: A. Smith, F.W. Just, A Bullat (City); C.R. Coburn, D.J. Thomas (North Shore); S.J. Davis, S.J. Murfitt, S Owens (Ponsonby).

On June 2 F. R. Halsey was transferred from Mount Albert to Marist while L. Conway was cleared to play for Mount Albert. K Campbell was registered with City, T.C. Allen and R Dunster with Manukau, and I Cruickshank with North Shore. On June 15 J.H. Shadbolt transferred from Glenora senior B to Mount Albert, while Roy Avery transferred from Newton 3rd grade to R.V. senior B. On June 17 J. O’Brien of Marist was transferred to South Auckland. In late June L.H. Cootes joined the Ponsonby club. He was the brother of Joe Cootes, the New Zealand international. L.H. Cootes was a former Horowhenua rugby representative and weighed 15st 4lb. On June 30 C.H. Lacey of the Grafton rugby club was registered with City Rovers.

On July 7 the following transfers were approved: Frank Pickrang (Manukau to Ponsonby), G Ellis (from Newton to Mount Albert and regraded to senior B). G Hamilton's clearance from Newton to Marist was granted. S Bluett was registered with City, S.A. and J.W. Prendergast with Ponsonby. On July 13 R.S. Pyke was transferred from Papakura senior B to R.V. On July 14 R.L. Best was granted a transfer from City senior B to Mount Albert senior B.A. Hamilton was registered with Mount Albert, while G. Radcliffe was regraded from Richmond senior reserves to senior B. On July 21 I. Wilson was granted a transfer from Mount Albert seniors, and lately St George (Wellington) to Papakura senior B.

On August 24 E Gifford was granted a transfer from Mount Albert senior B to Richmond senior B.

References

External links
 Auckland Rugby League Official Site

Auckland Rugby League seasons